Spruce Creek Rod and Gun Club is a historic clubhouse and associated outbuildings located at Franklin Township, Huntingdon County, Pennsylvania.  The clubhouse was built in 1905, and consist of a 2 1/2-story main section with a 2-story ell.  It is constructed of local fieldstone and lumber, and has gambrel roofs with dormers.  The building is in the Colonial Revival style.  Also on the property is a stone generator building (1906-1908), ice house, and a garage / carriage house (1908-1909) with a long shed addition (1920s).  The club was founded by prominent businessman primarily from Altoona, Pennsylvania.

It was added to the National Register of Historic Places in 1991.

References

Clubhouses on the National Register of Historic Places in Pennsylvania
Colonial Revival architecture in Pennsylvania
Buildings and structures completed in 1905
Buildings and structures in Huntingdon County, Pennsylvania
National Register of Historic Places in Huntingdon County, Pennsylvania
1905 establishments in Pennsylvania